Jesús Franco Manera (12 May 1930 – 2 April 2013) was a Spanish filmmaker, composer, and actor, known as a prolific director of low-budget exploitation and B-movies. In a career spanning from 1959 to 2013, he wrote, directed, produced, acted in, and scored approximately 173 feature films, working both in his native Spain and (during the rule of Francisco Franco) in France, West Germany, Switzerland and Portugal. Additionally, during the 1960s, he made several films in Rio de Janeiro and Istanbul.

Biography
Of Cuban and Mexican parentage, Franco was born in Madrid and studied at the city's Instituto de Investigaciones y Experiencias Cinematográficas and the Institut des hautes études cinématographiques in Paris. He began his career in 1954 (aged 24) as an assistant director in the Spanish film industry, performing many tasks including composing music for some films as well as co-writing a number of the screenplays. He assisted directors such as Joaquín Luis Romero Marchent, León Klimovsky and Juan Antonio Bardem. After working on more than 20 films for other directors, he decided to get into directing films himself in 1959, making a few musicals and a crime drama called Red Lips.

In 1960, Franco took Marius Lesoeur and Sergio Newman, two producer friends, to a cinema to see the newly released Hammer horror film The Brides of Dracula and the three men decided to go into the horror film business. His career took off in 1962 with The Awful Dr. Orloff (a.k.a. Gritos en la noche), which received wide distribution in the United States and the UK. Franco wrote and directed Orloff, and even supplied some of the music for the film. In the mid-1960s, he went on to direct two other horror films, then proceeded to turn out a number of James Bond-like spy thrillers and softcore sex films based on the works of the Marquis de Sade (which remained one of his major influences throughout his career).

Although he had some American box office success with Necronomicon - Geträumte Sünden (1968), 99 Women (1969) and two 1969 Christopher Lee films – The Bloody Judge and Count Dracula – he never achieved wide commercial success. Many of his films were only distributed in Europe, and most of them were never dubbed into English. 

After discovering Soledad Miranda (he first used her in his film Count Dracula), Franco moved from Spain to France in 1969 so that he could make more violent and erotic films free of the strict censorship in Spain at the time, and it was at this point that his career began to go downhill commercially as he turned to low-budget filmmaking with an accent on adult material. Miranda starred in a series of six erotic thrillers for Franco, all made within a one-year period (one of which Sex Charade was never released), after which she was killed in a tragic automobile accident in Portugal in 1970 just as her career was taking off. She and Franco had started filming her next project (Justine) which he abandoned entirely after her death. (Only about 40 minutes of the movie was shot at the time of her death). He had also planned to feature her in his next film, X312: Flight to Hell, which he made with another actress.

The Lina Romay years
A year or two after Miranda died, a grieving Franco discovered a new leading lady in actress Lina Romay. At the time, the teenage Romay was married to a young actor/photographer named Ramon Ardid (aka "Raymond Hardy"), who co-starred with Lina in 19 Franco films in the 1970s. But as Romay and Franco became more involved in their film projects together over the years, her marriage to Ardid broke up in 1975 and ended in divorce in 1978 (although Ardid continued working with Franco until 1980).

Franco was married at the time to Nicole Guettard (their marriage running approximately from 1962 to 1980), Ms. Guettard being gradually replaced in Franco's life by Romay. Guettard worked as a script consultant on some of Franco's films while they were married (sometimes credited as Nicole Franco), and even acted in a few of them. Her daughter from an earlier marriage, Caroline Riviere, also acted in a few Franco films in the early 1970s (including the risqué Exorcisme and The Perverse Countess)). Guettard died in 1996.

Franco and Romay worked together for 40 years, and lived together from 1980 onward, although they were only officially married on 25 April 2008. Until her death in 2012 (from cancer at age 57), Romay was his most regular actress, as well as his life companion and muse. Romay starred in approximately 109 Jesus Franco films, more than any other actor or actress. Although Romay was listed in the credits of several films as a co-director, actor Antonio Mayans stated in a recent interview that Franco used to credit her in that manner for business reasons, although she never actually co-directed any of their films together.

Although he produced a number of relatively successful horror films in the early 1970s (Dracula vs. Frankenstein, The Bare-Breasted Countess, A Virgin Among the Living Dead), many people in the industry considered him a porn director due to the huge number of X-rated adult films he began turning out (even his 1970s horror films featured abundant nudity). Franco returned to low-budget horror films in a brief comeback period from 1980 to 1983 (Mondo Cannibale, Bloody Moon, Oasis of the Zombies, Mansion of the Living Dead and Revenge in the House of Usher), but after 1983, his career took a second downturn as he returned to making mostly pornographic films, most of which left nothing to the imagination.  

In his later years, he did, however, get the opportunity to turn out two rather big-budget horror films – Faceless (1988) and Killer Barbys (1996) – both of which showed what great work he could still do when his projects were adequately funded. The entirety of his work after 1996 (beginning with Tender Flesh) was shot-on-video films of very low quality, none of which were distributed theatrically. Romay died of cancer in 2012 at age 57, after which Franco died on April 2, 2013 from natural causes at age 82.

Legacy
Jesus Franco (or Jess Franco) sometimes worked under various pseudonyms, including David Khune and Frank Hollmann. A fan of jazz music (and a musician himself), many of his pseudonyms were taken from jazz musicians such as Clifford Brown and James P. Johnson.

Franco's themes often revolved around lesbian vampires, women in prison, surgical horror, sadomasochism, zombies and sexploitation (including numerous films based on the writings of the Marquis de Sade). He worked in other exploitation film genres, such as cannibal films, spy films, giallo, crime films, science fiction, jungle adventure, Oriental menace, exorcist films, war movies, historical dramas and nunsploitation. His sex movies often contained long, uninterrupted shots of nude women writhing around on beds. Most of his hardcore films starred his lifelong companion Lina Romay (sometimes billed as "Candy Coster" or "Lulu Laverne"), who admitted in interviews to being an exhibitionist.

Franco was known for his use of a hand-held camera and zoom shots, which he felt lent realism to his films. He also was not averse to filming several movies at the same time, knocking together a second feature on the unsuspecting producer's dime. Many of his actors only found out years after the fact that Franco had actually starred them in films for which they had never even been paid.

His main claim to fame, however, is that he managed to direct approximately 173 motion pictures in his lifetime, encompassing a wide swath of different genres with practically no financial backing available to him. (Note:* Some sources which list as many as 200 titles in Franco's filmography are relisting the same films several times under their different variant titles.)

Sometimes referred to as the "European Ed Wood", Franco similarly attracted a circle of bizarre but loyal actors and technicians who moved with him over the years from project to project (while receiving very little, if any, money for their efforts). Many of his actors were over-the-hill performers in the twilight of their careers, many of his actresses brazen exhibitionists. He frequently worked with genre actors Lina Romay (who appeared in 109 Franco films), Antonio Mayans (who appeared in 50 Franco films), Howard Vernon (who appeared in 40 Franco films), Paul Müller (who appeared in 15 Franco films), Monica Swinn (who appeared in 15 Franco films), Christopher Lee, Jack Taylor, Ewa Strömberg, Anne Libert, Soledad Miranda, Maria Rohm,  William Berger, Dennis Price, Olivier Mathot, Muriel Montosse (a.k.a. Victoria Adams), Alice Arno, Montserrat Prous, Alberto Dalbés, Britt Nichols, Pamela Stanford, Kali Hansa and Klaus Kinski, all of whom are well known to Euro Horror film historians.

Zombie Lake vs. Oasis of the Zombies
Franco was supposed to write and direct a film for Eurocine Productions in 1980 called Lake of the Living Dead (a horror film about revived Nazi zombies) but after submitting the basic plot summary, he had a falling out with the producers, Marius and Daniel Lesoeur, over the ridiculously low budget he was allotted, and the producers immediately hired French horror film director Jean Rollin to direct it (later re-titling it Zombie Lake). 

The Lesoeurs later had Rollin shoot new (zombie) footage in 1981 to be added to Franco's A Virgin Among the Living Dead (1973) for its 1981 theatrical rerelease. Franco's original director's cut of the film was later made available on DVD. 

Franco later directed another film for the Lesouers called Oasis of the Zombies (a.k.a. Bloodsucking Nazi Zombies on VHS) in 1981, which had a plot very similar to Zombie Lake (also involving revived Nazi zombies). It was released in France as The Abyss of the Living Dead.  Franco simultaneously shot a variant Spanish language version of Oasis of the Zombies at the producers' expense, starring Lina Romay and his "regulars", which was apparently released only in Spain in 1982 as La Tumba de los Muertos Vivientes, which now appears to be a lost film.

Death
Franco suffered a severe stroke on 27 March 2013, and was taken to a hospital in Málaga, Spain, where he died six days later, on the morning of 2 April. He was 82.

Filmography (in order of production) 
(All of these films were directed by Franco, unless noted otherwise)

References

Further reading 
 [French] Daniel Bastié, Jess Franco : L’homme aux 200 films, Ed. Grand Angle, 2014
 Stephen Thrower, Murderous Passions: The Delirious Cinema of Jesús Franco (2015)
 Jess Franco, Memorias del tío Jess (2004) (autobiography, in Spanish)
 Stéphane du Mesnilot, Jess Franco - Énergies du fantasme (2004, in French)
 Alain Petit, Manacoa Files (1994–1999, in French)
 Lucas Balbo, Peter Blumenstock, Christian Kessler, Tim Lucas, Obsession - The Films of Jess Franco (1993)
 Stephen Thrower, Flowers of Perversion: The Delirious Cinema of Jesús Franco. Strange Attractor Press. (2018)
 Tim Lucas, "How to Read a Franco Film", in Video Watchdog No. 1 (1990)
 The book Immoral Tales: European Sex & Horror Movies 1956–1984 (1994), by Cathal Tohill and Pete Tombs, dedicates a chapter to Franco.
 Xavier Mendik. "Perverse Bodies, Profane Texts: Processes of Sadeian 'Mixture' in the Films of Jesús Franco" in Andy Black (ed.), Necronomicon: The Journal of Horror and Erotic Cinema Book Two London: Creation Books, 1998, pp. 6–29.
 Benedikt Eppenberger, Daniel Stapfer. Mädchen, Machos und Moneten: Die unglaubliche Geschichte des Schweizer Kinounternehmers Erwin C. Dietrich. Mit einem Vorwort von Jess Franco. Verlag Scharfe Stiefel, Zurich, 2006, 
  Robert Monell, "Il codice segreto di Jesús Franco", in Nocturno Dossier n. 60, luglio 2007
Robert Monell, essays on Devil Hunter/Il Cacciatore di Uomini and The Cannibals/White Cannibal Queen in Eaten Alive: Italian Cannibal and Zombie Movies pp. 145–148 Edited by Jay Slater, Plexus Publishing Limited, London (2002)
Robert Monell, Foreword: "Jess Franco—Cinema Degree Zero" in Il Caso Jesús Franco, edited by Francesco Cesari, (2010, in English, Italian and Spanish) Granviale Editore, Venezia, Italy, pp. 11–12.

External links 

 
 Santo and Friends (Hispanic horror film index)

1930 births
2013 deaths
Film directors from Madrid
Spanish film producers
Spanish cinematographers
Spanish film directors
German-language film directors
Horror film directors
Honorary Goya Award winners
Spanish male film actors
Spanish people of Cuban descent
Spanish people of Mexican descent
Spanish pornographic film directors
Spanish male pornographic film actors